Mexborough is one of 21 electoral wards in the Metropolitan Borough of Doncaster, South Yorkshire, England, covering the town of Mexborough. It forms part of the Doncaster North parliamentary constituency. Its three councillors are members of the localist party Mexborough First.

References 

Wards of Doncaster